Kuborn (Luxembourgish: Kéiber) is a village in northwestern Luxembourg.

It is situated in the commune of Wahl and has a population of 81.

Gallery

References 

Villages in Luxembourg